Atrial Light Chain-1 (ALC-1), also known as Essential Light Chain, Atrial is a protein that in humans is encoded by the MYL4 gene. ALC-1 is expressed in fetal cardiac ventricular and fetal skeletal muscle, as well as fetal and adult cardiac atrial tissue. ALC-1 expression is reactivated in human ventricular myocardium in various cardiac muscle diseases, including hypertrophic cardiomyopathy, dilated cardiomyopathy, ischemic cardiomyopathy and congenital heart diseases.

Structure
ALC-1 is a 21.6 kDa protein composed of 197 amino acids. ALC-1 is expressed in fetal cardiac ventricular and fetal skeletal muscle, as well as fetal and adult cardiac atrial tissue. ALC-1 binds the neck region of muscle myosin in adult atria. Two alternatively spliced transcript variants encoding the same protein have been found for this gene. Relative to ventricular essential light chain VLC-1, ALC-1 has an additional ~40 amino-acid N-terminal region that contains four to eleven residues that are critical for binding actin and modulating myosin kinetics.

Function 
ALC-1 is expressed very early in skeletal muscle and cardiac muscle development; two E-boxes and CArG box in the MYL4 promoter region regulate transcription. ALC-1 expression in cardiac ventricles decreases in early postnatal development, but is highly expressed in atria throughout all of adulthood. Normal atrial function is essential for embryogenesis, as inactivation of the MYL7 gene was embryonic lethal at ED10.5-11.5.

Evidence of ALC-1 isoform expression on contractile mechanics of sarcomeres came from experiments studying fibers from patients expressing a higher level of ALC-1 relative to VLC-1 in cardiac left ventricular tissue. Fibers expressing high ALC-1 exhibited a higher maximal velocity and rate of shortening compared to fibers with low amounts of ALC-1, suggesting that ALC-1 increases cycling kinetics of myosin cross-bridges and regulates cardiac contractility. Further biochemical studies unveiled a weaker binding of the Alanine-Proline-rich N-terminus of ALC-1 to the C-terminus of actin relative to VLC-1, which may explain the mechanism underlying the differences in cycling kinetics. The importance of this region has however raised skepticism. Further evidence for the contractile-enhancing properties of ALC-1 came from studies employing transgenesis to replace VLC-1 with ALC-1 in the mouse ventricle. This study demonstrated an increase in unloaded shortening velocity, both in skinned fibers and in an in vitro motility assay, as well as enhanced contractility and relaxation in whole heart experiments. These studies were supported by further studies in transgenic rats overexpressing ALC-1 which showed enhanced rates of contraction and relaxation, as well as left ventricular developed pressure in Langendorff heart preparations. Importantly, overexpression of ALC-1 was shown to attenuate heart failure in pressure-overloaded animals, by enhancing left ventricular developed pressure, maximal velocity of pressure development and relaxation.

Clinical significance
MYL4 expression in ventricular myocardium has shown to abnormally persist in neonates up through adulthood in patients with the congenital heart disease, tetralogy of Fallot. Altered ALC-1 expression is also altered in other congenital heart diseases, Double outlet right ventricle and infundibular pulmonary stenosis.  Moreover, in patients with aortic stenosis or aortic insufficiency, ALC-1 expression in left ventricles was elevated, and following valve replacement decreased to lower levels; ALC-1 expression also correlated with left ventricular systolic pressure.

Additionally, in patients with ischemic cardiomyopathy, dilated cardiomyopathy and hypertrophic cardiomyopathy, ALC-1 protein expression is shown to be reactivated, and ALC-1 expression correlates with calcium sensitivity of myofilament proteins in skinned fiber preparations, as well as ventricular dP/dtmax and ejection fraction.

Interactions 
ALC-1 interacts with:
ACTC1
MYH7

References

Further reading